Joseph Arthur Lesieur (September 13, 1907 – December 31, 1967) was an American professional ice hockey defenseman who played 100 games in the National Hockey League with the Montreal Canadiens and Chicago Black Hawks. Born in Fall River, Massachusetts, in 1931 he became the first American-born player to have his name engraved on the Stanley Cup as a member of the Montreal Canadiens. Lesieur played most of his professional hockey career with the Providence Reds of the Canadian-American (CanAm) Hockey League and the American (AHL) Hockey League, where he led the Reds to 3 Fontaine Cup titles and 2 Calder Cup championships as a player, team captain and/or player coach. 

In 1941, just days after the attack on Pearl Harbor and midway through the hockey season, Art became a national celebrity as the first U.S.-born professional hockey player to be drafted into the armed forces, turning in his team colors for Army drab. He served nearly five years, of which 32 months were in combat overseas commanding artillery batteries in both the European and North African theaters. 

Lesieur was inducted into the Rhode Island Hockey Hall of fame in 2021.

External links

1907 births
1967 deaths
American men's ice hockey defensemen
Chicago Blackhawks players
Ice hockey players from Massachusetts
Montreal Canadiens players
Pittsburgh Hornets players
Sportspeople from Fall River, Massachusetts
Stanley Cup champions